Sipho Sibiya Riopel (born July 28, 1971), also known as Siphos Sibya, is a retired South African-Canadian soccer player who is an assistant coach with the Vancouver Whitecaps women's team.

Player

Youth
In 1991, Sibiya, at the time known as Sipho Riopel, played a single season for Seattle Pacific University.

Professional
In 1994, Sibiya began his professional career with the Vancouver 86ers of the American Professional Soccer League.  He played four seasons in Vancouver.  In 1998, he played a single season with the Montreal Impact of the USISL A-League.  In December 1998, he tore his achilles tendon playing indoor soccer.  The injury kept him from playing outdoors in 1999.  In 1996, Sibiya began playing winter indoor soccer with the expansion Edmonton Drillers of the  National Professional Soccer League.  Sibiya played all four plus seasons of the team's existence.  The Drillers began the 2000–2001 season, but folded after nine games.  On December 4, 2001, the Milwaukee Wave selected Subiya in the first round of the dispersal draft.  He played three seasons with the Wave.  On August 38, 2003, the Wave traded Sibiya and future considerations to the Cleveland Force for Giuliano Oliviero.  The Force then traded Sibiya and D.J. Newsom to the St. Louis Steamers for Ato Leone.  In June 2004, Sibiya was again part of a complicated three team trade.  The Steamers traded Siphiya to the Milwaukee Wave for Joe Reiniger.  The Wave then traded Siphiya, Gary DePalma and future considerations to the Cleveland Force in exchange for Lee Edgerton.  While this was taking place, Sibiya was playing for the Edmonton Aviators of the USL A-League. On March 29, 2005, the Force traded Sibiya and Joel John Bailey to the Baltimore Blast for Neil Gilbert and Allen Eller.  On March 21, 2007, Sibiya signed with the Winnipeg Alliance of the Canadian Major Indoor Soccer League. In 2008, Sibiya became a player-coach for the Saskatoon Accelerators of the Professional Arena Soccer League.  In 2009, he became a player-coach with the Prince George Fury of the Professional Arena Soccer League.

National team
Sibiya played for the Canada national beach soccer team which went to the quarterfinals of the 2006 FIFA Beach Soccer World Cup.

Coach
Sibiya has held numerous coaching positions, including assistant coach to the 2006 Canada national beach soccer team and head coach of the Saskatoon Accelerators and Prince George Fury.  He is an assistant coach with the Vancouver Whitecaps women's team. From September 2009 to November 2011, he served as Technical Director for the Guildford Athletic Club in Surrey, British Columbia.

References

External links
 Sipho Sibiya on-air interview from 1997
 

Living people
1971 births
Soccer players from Pretoria
American Professional Soccer League players
Baltimore Blast (2001–2008 MISL) players
Black Canadian soccer players
Canadian beach soccer players
Canadian expatriate sportspeople in the United States
Canadian soccer players
Cleveland Force (2002–2005 MISL) players
Edmonton Drillers (1996–2000) players
Edmonton Aviators / F.C. players
Expatriate soccer players in Canada
Expatriate soccer players in the United States
Major Indoor Soccer League (2001–2008) players
Milwaukee Wave players
National Professional Soccer League (1984–2001) players
Montreal Impact (1992–2011) players
Seattle Pacific Falcons men's soccer players
South African emigrants to Canada
South African expatriate sportspeople in Canada
South African soccer players
St. Louis Steamers (1998–2006) players
Vancouver Whitecaps (1986–2010) players
Winnipeg Alliance players
Canadian soccer coaches
Association football forwards
Canadian men's futsal players
Player-coaches
Association football midfielders